Lucius Junius Polk (1802–1870) was an American politician and planter from Tennessee.

Early life
Lucius Junius Polk was born in 1802 in Raleigh, North Carolina. His father was Colonel William Polk. He moved to Maury County, Tennessee, in 1823.

Career
Polk served in the Tennessee Senate from 1831 to 1833. He served as Adjutant General for the state of Tennessee from 1851 to 1853.

Polk was also a wealthy cotton planter. He owned 30 slaves in 1836 and 52 slaves in 1840.

He was a Knight Templar.

Personal life
Polk married Mary Ann Eastin, a grand-niece of Rachel Jackson (the wife of President Andrew Jackson) in April 1832. Their wedding took place at the White House in Washington, D.C. They resided at Hamilton Place near Columbia, Tennessee, and had a large family together.

After Mary Ann Polk had died, Lucius married Frances Anne Erwin, with whom he had an additional son and daughter. Frances Polk also died in her 30s.

Death
He died in 1870. He was buried on the grounds of St. John's Episcopal Church.

References

External links

1802 births
1870 deaths
People from Maury County, Tennessee
Tennessee state senators
American planters
19th-century American politicians
American slave owners
Lucius J.